The women's alpine skiing combined event was part of the alpine skiing at the 1948 Winter Olympics programme. It was the second appearance of the event. The competition consisted of a downhill race held on Monday, February 2, 1948, and two slalom heats held on Wednesday, February 4, 1948. Twenty-eight alpine skiers from ten nations competed.

Medalists

Results

Downhill

The downhill race was held on Monday, February 2, 1948. It was part of the special downhill event. Twenty-eight of the 37 women who competed in the downhill race also started in the first slalom heat of the combined event.

Slalom

The slalom race was held on Wednesday, February 4, 1948, and started at 10:00a.m.

* 5 seconds penalty included.

Final standings

The winner of the downhill Hedy Schlunegger finished only 15th in the slalom, while Erika Mahringer, after finishing 15th in the downhill, won the slalom part of the combined event. Overall Mahringer won the bronze medal, but Schlunegger only finished eighth. Trude Beiser won the gold medal with an eighth place in slalom after finishing second in the downhill. Gretchen Fraser came up from eleventh place after the downhill to win the silver medal when finishing second in the slalom.

References

External links
 Official Olympic Report
article on Alpine Skiing winner Fraser from Stripes.com
Skiing Heritage Journal 1997 photo from page 38
 

Women's alpine skiing at the 1948 Winter Olympics
Olymp
Alp